The 1987 Australian Manufacturers' Championship was a CAMS sanctioned motor racing title for car manufacturers. The title, which was the seventeenth Australian Manufacturers' Championship, was contested concurrently with the 1987 Australian Touring Car Championship over a nine-round series. 
 Round 1, Calder Park, Victoria, 1 March
 Round 2, Symmons Plains, Tasmania, 8 March
 Round 3, Lakeside, Queensland, 5 April
 Round 4, Wanneroo Park, Western Australia, 26 April
 Round 5, Adelaide International Raceway, South Australia, 3 May
 Round 6, Surfers Paradise, Queensland, 31 May
 Round 7, Sandown Park, Victoria, 7 June
 Round 8, Amaroo Park, New South Wales, 21 June
 Round 9, Oran Park, New South Wales, 5 July

Each round was open to cars complying with CAMS Touring Car regulations which were based on international Group A Touring Car rules. Cars competed in two engine capacity classes:
 Up to 2500cc
 Over 2500cc
Championship points were awarded on a 20–15–12–10–8–6–4–3–2–1 basis for the top ten placings in each class at each round. However, points were only allocated for the best placed car from each manufacturer at each round
and only the best eight round results could be retained by each manufacturer.

Results

References

Further reading
 ATCC round results, Australian Motor Racing Year 1987/88, pages 315-316

External links
 1987 Australian Touring Car racing images Retrieved from www.autopics.com.au on 27 June 2009

Australian Manufacturers' Championship
Manufacturers' Championship